The Héctor Camacho versus Edwin Rosario fight took place on June 13, 1986, at the Madison Square Garden in New York City.

Background 
Televised in the United States by HBO Boxing and in Puerto Rico by WAPA-TV (and to several other countries), the fight garnered wide media attention, especially in Puerto Rico: It was the fourth time that two Puerto Ricans battled for a world boxing title, and, at that time, it was also the world title fight that pitted the two boxers who hailed from the closest birth-places in boxing history (Camacho was born in Bayamón, while Rosario was from Toa Alta, a mere fifteen-minute car drive away from Bayamón). Sports reporter Rafael Bracero travelled to New York to make a documentary about the fighters and the fight, and even former BSN basketball star Fufi Santori, a self-declared not fan of boxing, got caught in the fight's hype, making a prediction on television on the day of the fight. He predicted Camacho would win.

The fight was for the WBC World Lightweight Title, earned by Camacho after his win over José Luis Ramírez, who had, in turn, beaten Rosario for the title.

Undercard 
The undercard included a young Mike Tyson knocking out Reggie Gross in the first round and Julio César Chávez (who would later beat Camacho, Ramirez and Rosario) defending his WBC world Jr. Lightweight title with a seventh-round knockout of Refugio Rojas. Camacho was criticized by many Puerto Ricans because of the trunks he wore that day; he wore a Puerto Rican flag, but with the flag's white star to his back. This was seen by many as an unpatriotic act, although Camacho had always proclaimed to be proud of being a Puerto Rican, and continued to  proclaim so until he died in 2012.

Fight 
The first three rounds were swept by Camacho on all three judges' scorecards by keeping Rosario away with his jab and outcircling the pursuing challenger. In the fourth, Rosario began to turn things around by landing an uppercut in the final seconds, which earned him the round.

In round five, Rosario connected with a left to the chin as Camacho was getting ready to fire a right hand, and Camacho's knees buckled. On the verge of falling, Camacho took his distance for the rest of the round, and Rosario continued on pursue, landing other damaging blows. 

Rounds six to ten were dominated by Camacho (out of a possible fifteen combined rounds, as three judges were scoring the fight, Rosario was given only one round between rounds six and ten by one judge).

In round eleven, Rosario hurt Camacho again, with a left hook through Camacho's guard. Feeling he had a lead on the scorecards, Camacho again circled around the ring and grabbed, to avoid Rosario's punches. Rosario continued landing in round twelve, also sweeping the round on all judges' cards.

Minutes later, Camacho was announced as winner and still WBC world Lightweight champion by a split decision (scores of 115–113 twice for Camacho, and 114–113 for Rosario). The fight's result proved controversial, Puerto Ricans and other boxing fans who saw the fight have argued about the scoring ever since.

Aftermath 
Days later, El Vocero newspaper reported of a murder related to the fight: apparently, a man had made a bet with another man, and after Rosario lost, the murder victim told his killer that he really didn't have any money, causing the killer to get enraged and shoot him.

A rematch had been planned in 1997, but it never occurred.

On December 1, 1997, Rosario died of a pulmonary edema at age 34 while visiting his parents' house. For his part, Camacho died on November 24, 2012 at Bayamon, four days after being shot as part of a violent act where his friend was the apparent target.

Both Camacho and Rosario were later inducted into the International Boxing Hall of Fame, Rosario as a member of their 2006 class, and Camacho exactly 10 years later, as a member of their 2016 class.

Notes

|  style="width:35%; text-align:center;"| Preceded byKO7 Roque Montoya
|  style="width:30%; text-align:center;"| Edwin Rosario's boutsJune 13, 1986
|  style="width:35%; text-align:center;"| Succeeded byKO2 Livingstone Bramble
|-
|  style="width:35%; text-align:center;"| Preceded byW10 Freddie Roach 
|  style="width:30%; text-align:center;"| Hector Camacho's boutsJune 13, 1986
|  style="width:35%; text-align:center;"| Succeeded byW12 Cornelius Boza-Edwards

1986 in boxing
1986 in sports in New York City
1980s in Manhattan
Boxing matches at Madison Square Garden
June 1986 sports events in the United States